Bamenda Airport  is an airport serving Bamenda, the capital of the Northwest Province in Cameroon.

Airlines and destinations

References

External links
 

Airports in Cameroon
Bamenda